Auguste Haouisée, SJ (1 October 1877 – 10 September 1948) was a French prelate of the Roman Catholic Church, who served as Bishop of Shanghai from 1946 until his death, having previously served as its Apostolic Vicar.

Born in Évran, he was ordained as a Jesuit priest on 10 June 1910.

On 25 June 1928 Haouisée was appointed Coadjutor Apostolic Vicar of Nanking, and Titular Bishop of Cercina on 2 July that year. He received his episcopal consecration on the following 3 October from Bishop Henry Lécroart, SJ, with Bishops Adéodat-Roch Wittner, OFM, and André-François Defebvre, CM, serving as co-consecrators. Haouisée succeeded his fellow Jesuit, the late Próspero París, as Apostolic Vicar of Nanking on 13 May 1931.

Pope Pius XI later translated him to the first Apostolic Vicar of Shanghai on 13 December 1933. Upon his vicariate's elevation to a diocese on 11 April 1946, the Jesuit prelate became Bishop of Shanghai.

Haouisée died at age 70, less than a month before his next birthday.

References
 David Strong, A Call to Mission -- A History of the Jesuits in China 1842-1954. Volume 1: The French Romance, ATF Press, 2018.

External links
Catholic-Hierarchy

1877 births
1948 deaths
People from Côtes-d'Armor
French Jesuits
20th-century Roman Catholic bishops in China
Roman Catholic bishops in Shanghai
French expatriates in China
French Roman Catholic bishops in Asia